Ananya Kasaravalli is an Indian actress and director in the Kannada film industry, and a theatre artist in Karnataka, India. Born into a family of filmmakers, she had a successful acting career in films, television and theater before taking up filmmaking at LV Prasad Film and TV Academy, Chennai.

Ananya's notable films as an actress include Kaada Beladingalu (2007) and Naayi Neralu (2006). Her debut directorial feature Harikatha Prasanga/Chronicles of Hari (2016) won the Best film in the Indian Cinema Competition section in the 9th Bengaluru International Film Festival.

Career 
Ananya started her career in the industry as an actress. She first appeared as a child actor in Goodininda Gaganakke, a tele-serial which aired on Doordarshan. She has since appeared in several films such as Naayi Neralu, Kaada Beladingalu as well as popular television serials like Guptagamini, Malebillu, among others. In addition to her work in films and TV, Ananya was also actively involved in several Kannada theatre productions.

Ananya took a hiatus from her acting career to pursue filmmaking. In 2014, she graduated from LV Prasad Film & TV Academy, Chennai with a master's degree in filmmaking. Ananya worked as an assistant director before helming her own productions. She began by assisting her father, Girish Kasaravalli, on his films, Naayi Neralu and Hasina. She also worked as an assistant director on Oggarane directed by Prakash Raj and Vidaaya directed by P Sheshadri. She was also the costume designer for Naayi Neralu and Koormavatara.

Ananya came into her own as a young director with short films like Wasiyat Nama, Beyond Binary (a documentary on transfeminity) and Kappu Kallina Shaitana. All of them have been highly acclaimed in festival circuits and have won several awards in the short film category.

In 2016, she directed her first feature film Harikatha Prasanga/Chronicles of Hari which was based on a short story named Beladi Harishchandra by writer Gopalakrishna Pai. Harikatha Prasanga won in the Best Film category at the Jaffna International Cinema Festival as well as the Best Film in the Indian Cinema Competition at the 9th Bengaluru International Film Festival. It competed for the Centenary Award (Best Debut Feature of a Director) at IFFI. It was also the first Kannada cinema to be selected for the Busan International Film Festival. The film was also screened at the Museum of Moving Image - MOMI New York, South Asian International Festival, Singapore and the Jio MAMI International Film Festival among several others.

Ananya is also an associate professor at her alma mater, LV Prasad Film & TV Academy, where she teaches a course in direction.

Personal life
Ananya is the daughter of Girish Kasaravalli and Vaishali Kasaravalli, and sister of Apurva Kasaravalli. She is married to M S Santosh.

Filmography

As actor

Films

Telefilms and teleserials

Theatre

As director

Awards

References

External links

Actresses in Kannada cinema
Living people
Kannada people
Actresses from Karnataka
Indian film actresses
21st-century Indian actresses
Year of birth missing (living people)